Nikudari may refer to:

 Qara'unas or Neguderi, a Mongol group that settled in Afghanistan and eastern Persia.
 Negudar, a Mongol general under Berke, and a Golden Horde Noyan.

See also 
 Moghol people
 List of Hazara tribes